Michael or Mike Carroll may refer to:

Michael B. Carroll (born 1962), Pennsylvania politician
Michael Carroll (American football), American football coach in the United States
Michael Carroll (American writer), American writer
Michael Carroll (author) (born 1966), Irish author
Michael Carroll (Gaelic footballer), for Donegal
Michael Carroll (lottery winner) (born 1983), English National Lottery winner
Michael Patrick Carroll (born 1958), New Jersey assemblyman
Michael Carroll, photojournalist and subject of the documentary film Hand Held
Michael Carroll (space artist), astronomical artist and science writer
Michael W. Carroll, American legal academic
Mike Carroll (footballer) (born 1952), Scottish footballer
Mike Carroll (skateboarder) (born 1975), American skateboarder
Mike Carroll (politician), California politician

See also
Mick Carroll, guitarist in Mr Floppy
Mickey Carroll (1919–2009), American actor in The Wizard of Oz